The 1889–90 season is the 16th season of competitive football by Rangers.

Overview
Rangers played a total matches during the 1889–90 season.

Results
All results are written with Rangers' score first.

Scottish Cup

See also
 1889–90 in Scottish football
 1889–90 Scottish Cup

External links
1889–90 Rangers F.C.Results

Rangers F.C. seasons
Rangers